Dead Run is a 1967 American-German-French-Italian co-production crime film written and directed by Christian-Jaque. It is based on the novel  Dead Run by Robert Sheckley. The movie was shot in Berlin, Vienna, Paris, and Lucerne Kanton Luzern.

Cast  
Peter Lawford as Stephen Daine
Princess Ira von Fürstenberg as Suzanne Belmont
Georges Géret as Carlos
Maria Grazia Buccella as  Anna
Werner Peters as  Bardieff
Wolfgang Preiss as Inspector Noland
Horst Frank as  Manganne
Siegfried Wischnewski as  Klaus 
Eva Pflug as  Lili Manchingen 
Herbert Fux as Herbert
Luciano Pigozzi as  van Joost

See also
List of American films of 1967

References

External links

http://www.imdb.com/title/tt0061701/locations?ref_=tt_dt_dt

1967 films
Films directed by Christian-Jaque
Italian crime thriller films
Italian spy thriller films
American crime thriller films
American spy thriller films
French crime thriller films
French spy thriller films
German crime thriller films
German spy thriller films
West German films
1960s crime thriller films
1960s spy thriller films
Films set in West Germany
Films about the Berlin Wall
1960s chase films
Cold War spy films
Films based on American novels
Films shot in Vienna
Films shot in Berlin
Films shot in Paris
Films shot in Switzerland
Films scored by Gérard Calvi
English-language French films
English-language German films
English-language Italian films
1960s English-language films
1960s American films
1960s Italian films
1960s French films
1960s German films